Bahr is a surname. Notable people with the surname include:

Chris Bahr (born 1953), American football placekicker
Clint Bahr, member of TriPod
Daniel Bahr (born 1976), German politician (FDP)
Ed Bahr (born 1919), Canadian baseball player
Egon Bahr (1922–2015), German politician (SPD)
Florence Riefle Bahr (1909–1998), American painter
Frederick John Bahr (1837–1885), American entrepreneur
Hermann Bahr (1863–1934), Austrian writer
Iris Bahr, American actress
Jason Bahr, (born 1972) American composer
Jean Bahr, American hydrogeologist and professor
Jerzy Bahr, (1944-2016), Polish diplomat
Kurt Bahr, American businessman and politician from Missouri
Leonard Bahr (1905–1990), American painter
Matt Bahr (born 1956), American football placekicker
Philip Manson-Bahr (born Philip Henry Bahr, 1881-1966), English zoologist and physician
Ulrike Bahr (born 1964), German politician
Walter Bahr (born 1927), American international soccer player

See also 
von Bahr, a surname
Bähr, a surname

German-language surnames
Surnames from nicknames